Babcock is an English surname. Notable people with the surname include: 

Alpheus Babcock (1785–1842), American piano and musical  instrument maker
Audrey Babcock American operatic mezzo-soprano
Barbara Babcock (born 1937), American actress
Betty Lee Babcock (1922–2013), American businesswoman and politician
Brad Babcock (1939–2020), American college baseball coach
Brenton D. Babcock (1830–1906), mayor of Cleveland, Ohio
Charlie Babcock (born 1979), American actor
Chip Babcock (born 1949), American attorney
Christine Babcock, American runner
Courtney Babcock (born 1972), Canadian runner
Edward V. Babcock (1864–1948), mayor of Pittsburgh, Pennsylvania
E. B. Babcock (1877–1954), American plant geneticist
Elnora Monroe Babcock (1852–1934), American suffragist, press chair
Emma Whitcomb Babcock (1849–1926), American litterateur, author
Erin Babcock (1981–2020), Canadian politician
Ezekiel Babcock (1828–1905), American farmer and politician
Jasper Babcock (1821–1896), American politician 
Laura Babcock (1988/89–2012), Canadian murder victim who was murdered by Dellen Millard and Mark Smich
George Herman Babcock (1832–1893), American inventor
Harold D. Babcock (1882–1968), American astronomer
Havilah Babcock (1837–1905), American businessman
Horace W. Babcock (1912–2003), American astronomer
Ira Babcock (1808–1888), American pioneer and judge
John Babcock (1900–2010), last surviving Canadian World War I veteran
John C. Babcock (1836–1908), rowing pioneer and American Civil War spy
Joseph Park Babcock (1893–1949), American Mahjong promoter
Joseph Weeks Babcock (1850–1909), Wisconsin member of the U.S. House of Representatives
Lorenzo A. Babcock, first attorney general of Minnesota Territory
Mabel Keyes Babcock, American landscape architect
Maud Babcock (1867–1954), American educator
Mike Babcock (born 1963), Canadian hockey head coach and former player
Orville E. Babcock (1835–1884), American Civil War general
Rob Babcock, (born c. 1953), former general manager of the Toronto Raptors NBA basketball team
Roscoe Lloyd Babcock, (1897–1981) California artist
Sam Babcock (1901–1970), American football player
Shelby Babcock (born 1992), American softball player
Stanton Babcock (1904–1979), American equestrian
Stefan Babcock (born 1988), vocalist and guitarist for PUP
Stephen Moulton Babcock (1843–1931), American agricultural chemist
Tim Babcock (1919–2015), governor of Montana
Vearne Clifton Babcock (1887–1972), American aeronautical engineer
Warren Babcock (1866–1913), American politician and educator
Wendy Babcock (1979–2011), Canadian activist for the rights of sex workers

Fictional characters
C. C. Babcock, from the sitcom The Nanny
Giles Babcock, character in Justin Cronin's novel The Passage
Iris Babcock, Sergeant-Major from the Honorverse

Surnames
English-language surnames
Surnames of English origin
Surnames of British Isles origin